The 35th European Men's Artistic Gymnastics Championships was held from 18 to 21 August 2022 in Munich, Germany as part of the second multi-sport European Championships. There were 38 nations that sent athletes. Gymnasts from Russia and Belarus were banned due to the 2022 Russian invasion of Ukraine.

Schedule

Medals summary

Medalists

Medal standings

Overall

Senior

Junior

Senior results

Team

All-around
76 gymnasts took part in the individual all-around competition with no prior qualification round. The following is the top 10 of the all-around.

Floor

Pommel horse

Rings

Vault

Parallel bars

Horizontal bar

Junior results

Team
25 nations took part in the junior team competition. The following were the top 8 teams.

All-around
74 gymnasts took part in the junior individual all-around competition with no prior qualification round. The following is the top 10 of the all-around.

Floor

Pommel horse

Rings

Vault

Parallel bars

Horizontal bar

Qualification

Senior

Team competition

Floor

Pommel horse

Rings

Vault

Parallel bars

Horizontal bar

Junior

Floor

Pommel horse

Rings

Vault

Parallel bars

Horizontal bar

World Championships qualification 
This event served as qualification for the 2022 World Championships in Liverpool.  The top thirteen teams that qualified a full team to compete are Great Britain, Turkey, Spain, Italy, France, Switzerland, Germany, Hungary, Ukraine, Romania, the Netherlands, Belgium, and Austria.

The top 23 individuals (max two per country) not part of a team qualified to compete as an individual.  Those individuals were: Sofus Heggemsnes (NOR), Ivan Tikhonov (AZE), David Huddleston (BUL), Robert Kirmes (FIN), Elias Koski (FIN), David Rumbutis (SWE), Dominick Cunningham (IRL), Gagik Khachikyan (ARM), Harald Wibye (NOR), Jose Nogueira (POR), Uri Zeidel (ISR), Valgard Reinhardsson (ISL), Tomas Kuzmickas (LTU), Georgios Angonas (CYP), Gytis Chasazyrovas (LTU), Yordan Aleksandrov (BUL), Daniel Fox (IRL), Joakim Lenberg (SWE), Michalis Chari (CYP), Guilherme Campos (POR), Apostolos Kanellos (GRE), Bidzina Sitchinava (GEO), Saba Abesadze (GEO), Ricards Plate (LAT).

Notes

References

European Artistic Gymnastics Championships
European Artistic Gymnastics Championships
European Artistic Gymnastics Championships
2022 European Championships
International gymnastics competitions hosted by Germany
Sport in Munich
European Artistic Gymnastics Championships